WGH (1310 kHz) is a commercial AM radio station licensed to Newport News, Virginia, and serving Hampton Roads. WGH is owned and operated by Max Media, and airs a sports radio format.  It mostly carries shows from Fox Sports Radio and calls itself "Fox Sports 1310 and 100.9."  Studios and offices are on Greenwich Road in Virginia Beach, Virginia.

WGH operates with 20,000 watts by day and 5,000 watts at night. To protect other stations on 1310 AM, it uses a directional antenna, sending much of the signal to the east.  The transmitter is off Mary Ann Drive in Hampton, just over the line from Newport News.  Programming is also heard on 250-watt FM translator W265EF at 100.9 MHz in Newport News.

History
Station WPAB was first licensed on 940 kHz on December 6, 1926. The station was assigned the call letters WGH and moved to 1310 kHz in 1928. Because it dates back to the early days of radio, WGH is the only station in Virginia to retain its three-letter call sign, although there were periods in its history when it used the call letters WNSY and WCMS. The call letters for WGH and its sister station 97.3 WGH-FM stand for "World's Greatest Harbor", a slogan for the Hampton Roads or Tidewater area of Virginia, where there is a large shipbuilding industry and both commercial and military ports.  For much of the 1960s and 1970s, WGH was a popular top 40 station.

On October 5, 2009, WGH swapped formats with WXEZ (94.1 FM) and became an urban gospel station as "Star 1310". On July 28, 2017, WGH switched to a format of 1950s-60s oldies.

On February 28, 2019, WGH changed its format from oldies to urban talk and urban oldies, branded as "1310 The Power".

On June 15, 2020, WGH changed its format to business talk, branded as "Money Talk".

On January 6, 2023, WGH changed its format from business talk to sports, branded as "Fox Sports 1310".

References

External links
WGH Online

1928 establishments in Virginia
Radio stations established in 1928
GH (AM)
GH (AM)
Max Media radio stations
Fox Sports Radio stations